Cruel Cruel World is the third studio album by Canadian pop duo Prozzäk. It was released by MapleMusic Recordings on 29 November 2005 in Canada, and 16 May 2006 in the United States.

Track listing
 "When I Think Of You"- 3:39
 "Tricky"- 3:35
 "How Beautiful"- 3:56
 "Just Friends"- 3:21
 "Starting Over"- 3:46
 "Don't Love Me That Way"- 3:27
 "Sweeping Romance"- 2:44
 "Clothes We Wear"- 3:15
 "It's Not So Bad"- 3:37
 "If You're Ready"- 3:46
 "Cruel Cruel World"- 3:25
 "I Want To Be Loved"- 3:26

Personnel
Everything by Jason Levine (Simon) and James Bryan/McCollum (Milo)
Except: co-produced and engineered by Lenny Derose at Sony Oasis Studio, Toronto
Mixed by Mark Makoway at Rumblecone Music
Mastered by Wreckhouse
Character design and illustrations by Frederick Marcello Wilimot, based on original characters by Scott Harder
Layout and additional design by Sean Bryson and Chris Fairhurst for Maplemusic Recordings

Release history

2005 albums
Prozzäk albums